Lists of vampires may refer to:

List of vampires
List of vampiric creatures in folklore
List of dhampirs